Isla de Luzón was an  protected cruiser of the Spanish Navy which fought in the Battle of Manila Bay.

Technical characteristics
Isla de Luzón was built by Elswick in the United Kingdom.  She was laid down on 25 February 1886, launched on 13 November 1886, and completed on 22 September 1887.  She had a steel hull and one funnel.  She had a large beam for her length, and tended to have poor seakeeping qualities, burying her bow into waves. Small for a protected cruiser, she was often called a gunboat by 1898.

Operational history

Upon completion, Isla de Luzón joined the Metropolitan Fleet in Spain. She participated in the Rif War of 1893–1894, bombarding the reef between Melilla and Chafarinas. When the Philippine Revolution of 1896–1898 broke out in the Philippines, Isla de Luzón was sent there to join the squadron of Rear Admiral Patricio Montojo de Pasaron.

Isla de Luzón was still part of Montojo's squadron when the Spanish–American War broke out in April 1898. She was anchored with the squadron in Cañacao Bay under the lee of the Cavite Peninsula east of Sangley Point, Luzon, eight miles southwest of Manila, when, early on the morning of 1 May 1898, the United States Navy's Asiatic Squadron under Commodore George Dewey, found Montojo's anchorage and attacked. The resulting Battle of Manila Bay was the first major engagement of the Spanish–American War.

The American squadron made a series of firing passes, wreaking great havoc on the Spanish ships. At first, Dewey's ships concentrated their fire on Montojo's flagship, unprotected cruiser , and on unprotected cruiser , and Isla de Luzón suffered little damage. When Reina Cristina became disabled, Isla de Luzón and her sister ship, came alongside to assist her under heavy American gunfire.

With Montojo's squadron battered into submission, Isla de Luzón was scuttled in shallow water to avoid capture. She had taken three hits, one of which had disabled one of her guns, and six of her crew had been wounded. After she sank, her upper works remained above water, and a team from gunboat  went aboard and set her on fire.

After the United States occupied the Philippines, the United States Navy seized, salvaged, and repaired her and commissioned her as gunboat  in 1900 for service in the United States.

See also

Notes

References
Alden, John D. The American Steel Navy: A Photographic History of the U.S. Navy from the Introduction of the Steel Hull in 1883 to the Cruise of the Great White Fleet, 1907–1909. Annapolis, Maryland: Naval Institute Press, 1972. .
Chesneau, Roger, and Eugene M. Kolesnik, Eds. Conway's All The World's Fighting Ships 1860–1905. New York, New York: Mayflower Books Inc., 1979. .
Nofi, Albert A. The Spanish–American War. Conshohocken, Pennsylvania: Combined Books Inc., 1996. .

External links

 The Spanish–American War Centennial Website: Isla de Luzon
 Department of the Navy: Naval Historical Center: Online Library of Selected Images: Spanish Navy Ships: Isla de Luzon (Cruiser, 1886–1898)
 Navsource.org: USS Isla de Luzon

Isla de Luzon-class cruisers
Ships built on the River Tyne
1886 ships
Spanish–American War cruisers of Spain
Maritime incidents in 1898
Vessels captured by the United States Navy
Shipwrecks of the Spanish–American War
Shipwrecks in the South China Sea
Shipwrecks of the Philippines
Ships built by Armstrong Whitworth